is a yonkoma manga series by Masashi Ueda which has been serialized in several magazine. In the early 1980s, the manga was published simultaneously in Takeshobo's Kindai Mahjong, Kindai Mahjong Original, and Gamble Punch. It was then published in Manga Life magazine from November 1984 (in the first issue of the magazine) to 1994. The series was started again in January 2001 and is currently running in Manga Life. The manga was adapted into a theatrical film and an OVA in the early 1980s.

Several pachinko systems have been released which feature Furiten-kun as the theme. It won the 28th Bungeishunjū Manga Award along with Ueda's Kariage-kun in 1982.

Anime film

Staff
Director: Taku Sugiyama
Producers: Seishi Nishino, Satoshi Sakai
Executive Producer: Katsuo Seijō
Original story: Masashi Ueda
Screenplay: Noboru Shiroyama, Tsunehisa Itō, Haruya Yamazaki, Taku Sugiyama

Sources:

Cast
Furiten-kun: Haruo Chikada

Sources:

References

1980 manga
1981 anime films
1984 manga
2001 manga
2002 manga
Animated films based on manga
Manga adapted into films
Mahjong in anime and manga
Takeshobo manga
Toho animated films
Yonkoma
Seinen manga